The Perkasie Tunnel is a train tunnel located behind the Post Office in Perkasie, Pennsylvania on 7th Street, on a line owned by SEPTA and operated by the East Penn Railroad. The tunnel itself is located near 8th Street and Ridge Road.  Northbound passenger trains going through the tunnel traveled to Union Station in Bethlehem and points beyond.  Many southbound passenger trains were destined for Reading Terminal in Philadelphia. The Perkasie station on 8th Street was formerly equipped with a water tower, of which not a trace remains.

Physical features
The tunnel is curved and the entrances are constructed in such a way that light entering the tunnel at the 8th Street entrance is visible from the opposite end of the tunnel near Ridge Road; this is apparently not the case in the opposite direction. The edges of the tunnel are jagged, allowing beautiful ice structures to form when water dripping from the top and sides freezes in winter. The tunnel is lined with stone masonry at both entrances. The walls in the interior of the tunnel are unfinished, blasted stone. The tunnel bore remains cool enough in summer that track workers or trespassers require a light jacket or sweatshirt. Signage on the Perkasie Tunnel consists of graffiti and the occasional "No Trespassing" sign. Whispers inside the tunnel are said to carry to each end slowly and eerily. Cell phone service is unavailable inside the tunnel.

Trains
The last scheduled passenger train traveled though Perkasie on July 29, 1981, after which passenger service terminated as part of a broader SEPTA strategy of discontinuing all non-electrified passenger service. Conrail continued freight operations to Quakertown until Conrail's demise in the mid-1990s, at which point CSX took over operations and leased the line between Lansdale and Telford. The trains passing through the Perkasie tunnel currently stop in the town of Perkasie only when necessary to switch freight cars to the (otherwise unused) Southbound track for storage.

SEPTA discussed abandoning the tracks between Telford and Quakertown when financial incentives for continued CSX freight service declined below the break-even point for a Class-1 railroad.  This portion of the Bethlehem Branch was saved from abandonment when short line railroad company East Penn Railway (EPRY) leased the portion between Telford and Quakertown in 1997 to continue operations under the name East Penn Railroad (ESPN). Depending on the workload, East Penn Railroad, operating out of Quakertown, runs trains on the Bethlehem Branch two to three times a week as well as the occasional weekend. SEPTA remains owner of the Bethlehem Branch from Lansdale to Hellertown.  Norfolk Southern owns the section from Hellertown through Bethlehem. Operational track presently ends at California Road just above Quakertown because the East Penn Railroad had no use for it.

See North Pennsylvania Railroad for more Bethlehem Branch information.

SEPTA has also proposed the re-activation of train service to Quakertown, but SEPTA has not planned such a task.

See also
 List of tunnels documented by the Historic American Engineering Record in Pennsylvania

References

External links

Transportation buildings and structures in Bucks County, Pennsylvania
Railroad tunnels in Pennsylvania
Historic American Engineering Record in Pennsylvania
Reportedly haunted locations in Pennsylvania